is a Japanese economist and politician of the Liberal Democratic Party.

Early life and education 
A native of Setagaya, Tokyo, Satō received a bachelor's degree in Political Science from Columbia University, a master's degree in international affairs from Columbia University, and a Ph.D in economics from New York University. She also studied abroad in the University of Paris (Nanterre) and the Graduate Institute of International and Development Studies in Geneva. She began her economic career in 1998 as an economist at Nikko Citigroup Securities, and then worked for JPMorgan Securities and finally as chief economist at Credit Suisse First Boston in Japan.

While being economist in the financial industry, Sato also served as a member of the Industrial Structure Council of the Ministry of Economy, Trade and Industry (METI), a member of the Working Group on Taxation Problems of the Ministry of Finance (MOF), an advisor to LDP’s committee on fiscal reconstruction, as well as providing policy recommendations to members of the Bank of Japan’s Policy Board, and other ministries, including the Cabinet Office, of the Japanese government.

Political career 
Satō was elected to the House of Representatives for the first time in 2005, as part of a group of candidates of Liberal Democratic Party (LDP) hand-picked by Prime Minister Junichiro Koizumi. Sato was sent to the constituency of Seiko Noda, the Gifu 1st district, with Noda having left the LDP after opposing Koizumi's plan to privatize Japan Post. Noda prevailed in the district, but Sato won a seat through the proportional representation list.

Sato and Noda publicly made amends prior to the 2009 general election, in which Sato was assigned to run for a different seat, the Tokyo 5th district. In the wake of the overwhelming victory of the Democratic Party of Japan (DPJ) in the 2009 general elections, Sato also lost the race in the Tokyo 5th district, but was elected to the House of Councillors in 2010. After serving almost five years in the House of Councillors, LDP sent Sato back to the House of Representatives to run for the Osaka 11th district in the 2014 general election, in which she won.

In December 2012, Sato was appointed to the Parliamentary Vice-Minister for Economy, Trade and Industry, to formulate the growth policy for “the Abenomics,” at the time Prime Minister Shinzo Abe took over the government from DPJ. In October 2018, Sato was appointed as the State Minister for Internal Affairs and Communications, to handle Japan’s telecommunications policy in such cutting-edge areas as 5G, IoT, big data, and artificial intelligence (AI), as well as broadcasting and the Japan Post group.

During her time in the Diet (national legislature), Sato also served on many committees and held several party offices, including:

 Vice Chairman, LDP Committee on Science, Technology and Innovations
Vice Chairman, LDP Committee on Small and Medium-sized Enterprise Policies
Vice Chairman, LDP Committee on Tourism Nation Building
Deputy Chairman, LDP Committee on Foreign Affairs and Economic Pact Agreements (EPAs)
Chairman, Special Committee on Consumer Problems of the House of Councillors
Chairman, LDP Members’ Association to Consider Japan’s Prosperity in Global Society
Parliamentary Vice-Minister of Economy, Trade and Industry
 Deputy Secretary-General of LDP
 Deputy Chairman, LDP Policy Board in the House of Councillors
 Minister of State for Economic, Fiscal and Finance Policy of LDP's Shadow Cabinet
 Vice-Chairman, Committee on Organizations Involved with Public Finance, Finance and Securities of LDP

References

External links 
  
 Yukari's Economist
 Sato's official Twitter account

1961 births
Living people
People from Setagaya
Members of the House of Representatives (Japan)
Female members of the House of Representatives (Japan)
Koizumi Children
Japanese economists
Japanese women economists
Sophia University alumni
School of International and Public Affairs, Columbia University alumni
Graduate Institute of International and Development Studies alumni
New York University alumni
Liberal Democratic Party (Japan) politicians
21st-century Japanese women politicians